The End Begins is a solo EP released by Jim Ward. It is the third and final episode of his acoustic EP trilogy. It was released February 14, 2011 via Tembloroso.com through digital download. This is the only EP from Ward's acoustic trilogy that was released through digital download only.

The song "Lake Travis" is entirely an instrumental track, with no lyrics. "Waves In Spanish" is a narrative. "Decades" is a love song that Ward wrote for his wife. "The Beginning Of The End" was written as a thank-you song to all fans and listeners.

Track listing

Personnel
Jim Ward - Guitar, vocals
Gabe González - Guitar, Mixing and Mastering
Nicole Smith - Piano, Back up vocals on "Decades"
Joel Quintana - Drums and Percussion
Chad Morris - Trumpet
Armando Alvarez - Design

References 

2011 EPs